Desulfatitalea tepidiphila is a Gram-negative and sulfate-reducing bacterium from the genus of Desulfatitalea which has been isolated from tidal flat sediments from the Tokyo Bay on Japan.

References

External links 
Type strain of Desulfatitalea tepidiphila at BacDive -  the Bacterial Diversity Metadatabase

Desulfobacterales
Bacteria described in 2013